The year 1908 was marked, in science fiction, by the following events.

Births and deaths

Births 
 November 23 : Nelson S. Bond, American writer, (d. 2006).

Deaths

Events

Awards 
The main science-fiction Awards known at the present time did not exist at this time.

Literary releases

Novels 
  Le Docteur Lerne, sous-dieu, novel by Maurice Renard.

Stories collections

Short stories

Comics

Audiovisual outputs

Movies 
Excursion to the Moon

See also 
 1908 in science
 1907 in science fiction
 1909 in science fiction

References

science-fiction
Science fiction by year